The Holme of the Holme Valley, West Yorkshire, England is a tributary of the River Colne, West Yorkshire.  The source is via Digley Reservoir, fed firstly by the run-off from Brownhill Reservoir, then by Dobbs Dike. Banks along the upper valley are mostly urbanised and are in the Holme Valley civil parish.

Course
From Digley Reservoir, the river flows north-east through Holmbridge and Holmfirth. It flows NNE to Thongsbridge and Brockholes then north to reach Honley, Berry Brow and Lockwood. It wends northwards and joins the Colne (one of five rivers of that name) just south of Huddersfield town centre at Folly Hall.

Flooding

The river was prone to flooding, the earliest recorded in 1738. In 1840 the dam of Bilberry Reservoir was built over a stream, but the work had not been done properly and the stream not correctly redirected. Thus in February 1852, the reservoir broke its confines and flooded the valley as far as Holmfirth. It caused 81 deaths and the destruction of many homes and businesses.

Geography
Natural upper catchment
The top of the valley is surrounded by the high, wooded hills on their lower slopes only, of Holme Moss, Harden Moss and Cartworth Moor. 

Geology
The underlying bedrock was laid down in the late Carboniferous period and is primarily of Millstone Grit with some sandstone interspersed with thin coal seams.

Lists

Tributaries
 Dobb Dike
 Black Sike Dike
 River Ribble
 Hebble Dike/Mark Bottoms Dike
 New Mills Dike
 Mag Brook
 Dean Clough

Settlements
 Holmbridge
 Holmfirth
 Wooldale
 Netherthong
 Thongsbridge
 Brockholes
 Honley
 Netherton
 Huddersfield

Road crossings
 A6024 Woodhead Road, Holmbridge
 Dobb Lane, Holmbridge
 Hollowgate, Holmfirth
 A635, Victoria Road, Holmfirth
 Bridge Lane, Holmfirth
 Miry Lane, Thongsbridge
 Smithy Place Lane, Brockholes
 A6024, Honley
 Northgate, Honley
 Magdale road, Honley
 B6110, Armitage Road, Armitage Bridge, Huddersfield
 A616, Bridge Street, Huddesfield
 Queens Mill Road, Huddersfield

Gallery

See also
Holmfirth Floods

References

Rivers of Kirklees
Rivers of Huddersfield
Rivers and valleys of the Peak District
Holme Valley
Rivers of West Yorkshire
Aire catchment